Clavus isowai is a species of sea snail, a marine gastropoda mollusk in the family Drilliidae.

Original description
Poppe G.T., Tagaro S.P. & Goto Y. (2018). New marine species from the Central Philippines. Visaya. 5(1): 91-135 page(s): 105, pl. 9 figs 4-5.

References

External links

 Worms Link

isowai